Clavascidium umbrinum, also known as Catapyrenium umbrinum, is a lichen. It is characteristically 2 to 4 millimeters wide and medium to dark brown found on soil.

Found in Europe and North America; rather rare in Arizona, California, Chihuahua and Baja California.

References

Fungi described in 1996
Verrucariales